Locomotives SFM 1-34 refers to a class of 2-2-2 steam locomotives of the Società Italiana per le Strade Ferrate Meridionali (SFM). They were designed for hauling fast passenger trains.

History

The locomotives, numbered from 1 to 34, were ordered by SFM from Cail of Paris and Officine di Pietrarsa to work on the lightly-graded lines Bologna - Ancona and Ancona - Bari.

In 1885, with the creation of the great national networks, the series was divided between Rete Adriatica (the Adriatic Network - RA), which obtained units 1 to 26, and Rete Mediterranea (the Mediterranean Network - RM), which obtained units 27 to 34 and renumbered them 7 to 14.

In 1905, with the establishment of the Ferrovie dello Stato (FS), 12 units were still in operation. FS classified them as Class 100 with numbers 1001–1012. After a few years they were withdrawn and scrapped.

References

Further reading
    P.M. Kalla-Bishop, Italian State Railways Steam Locomotives, Abingdon, Tourret, 1986. .

2-2-2 locomotives
100
Railway locomotives introduced in 1863
Standard gauge locomotives of Italy
Rete Mediterranea steam locomotives
Rete Adriatica steam locomotives
Passenger locomotives